Jean-Marie De Zerbi (born 20 November 1959) is a French former professional footballer who played as a striker. Since his retirement as a player he has worked as an assistant coach at various club, working with manager Frédéric Antonetti for years.

He was part of SC Bastia team that reached 1978 UEFA Cup Final.

References

1959 births
Living people
Sportspeople from Bastia
French footballers
Association football forwards
SC Bastia players
Tours FC players
Ligue 1 players
Ligue 2 players
Footballers from Corsica
French football managers
SC Bastia non-playing staff
OGC Nice non-playing staff
Lille OSC non-playing staff
FC Metz non-playing staff